The 2021–22 Kategoria Superiore was the 83rd official season, or 86th season of top-tier football in Albania (including three unofficial championships during World War II) and the 22nd season under the name Kategoria Superiore. The season began in 10 September 2021 and ended on 26 May 2022. Tirana won the league title on 7 May 2022, with 3 matches to spare.

The winners of this season's Kategoria Superiore earned a place in the first qualifying round of the 2022–23 Champions League, with the second and third placed clubs earning a place in the first qualifying round of the 2022–23 Europa Conference League.

Teams
Two clubs have earned promotion from the Kategoria e Parë, Dinamo Tirana (promoted after a nine-year absence) and Egnatia (promoted after a sixteen-year absence). Apolonia (relegated after only one year in the top flight) and Bylis (relegated after two-years in the top flight) were relegated to Kategoria e Parë at the conclusion of last season.

Locations

Stadiums

Personnel and kits

Note: Flags indicate national team as has been defined under FIFA eligibility rules. Players and Managers may hold more than one non-FIFA nationality.

Managerial changes

League table

Results
Clubs will play each other four times for a total of 36 matches each.

First half of season

Second half of season

Positions by round
The table lists the positions of teams after each week of matches.

Relegation play-off

Both clubs remained in their respective leagues.

Season statistics

Scoring

Top scorers

Discipline

Player 
 Most yellow cards: 14
 Erdenis Gurishta (Vllaznia)
 Goran Siljanovski (Dinamo Tirana)

 Most red cards: 2
 Albion Marku (Partizani)
 Asion Daja (Teuta)
 Bekim Dida (Kastrioti)
 Mevlan Adili (Vllaznia)
 Vangjel Zguro (Skënderbeu)

Awards

Annual awards 

Source:

See also
 Kategoria Superiore

Notes and references

Notes

References

External links
 
Kategoria Superiore at uefa.com

2021–22
Albania
1